"You're Still Here" is a song recorded by American country music artist Faith Hill.  It was released in May 2003 as the fourth single from her fifth album Cry (2002). The song reached number 28 on the Billboard Hot Country Singles & Tracks chart. The song was written by Matraca Berg and Aimee Mayo.

Chart performance

References

2003 singles
2002 songs
Faith Hill songs
Songs written by Matraca Berg
Songs written by Aimee Mayo
Song recordings produced by Byron Gallimore
Warner Records singles